Liv Solbjørg Nilsson (28 January 1943 – 4 July 1994) was a Norwegian trade unionist and politician for the Labour Party.

By vocation, she was an office clerk at Bodø Hospital. She was elected as leader of the Norwegian Union of Municipal Employees in Nordland, later advancing to the national leadership. In 1982, she was elected as leader-designate, as it was known that the current leader would retire in 1985. She chaired the Union of Municipal Employees from 1985 to her death in 1994. During her reign, the union reached the milestone of 200,000 members. She was also a member of Bodø municipal council, from 1985 to her death a secretariat member of the Norwegian Confederation of Trade Unions, and from 1985 to 1992 a central board member of the Labour Party.

She struggled with cancer since 1987 and died at the Norwegian Radium Hospital in July 1994. She was buried in Bodø.

References

1943 births
1994 deaths
Politicians from Bodø
Norwegian trade union leaders
Labour Party (Norway) politicians
Deaths from cancer in Norway